Giuseppe Mazzuoli (c. 1536– November 9, 1589) was an Italian painter of the Mannerist period, active mainly in the court of Alfonso II d'Este of Ferrara.

He is nicknamed il Bastaruolo (or il Bastarolo by authors writing in English), from a dialect term describing his father's profession selling foodstuffs, including corn (biade).  He painted the ceiling of the church of the Gesu in Ferrara, a work started by Giovanni Francesco Surchi. Mazzuoli was reportedly a pupil of Dosso Dossi, and the teacher of Carlo Bononi and Domenico Moni. Among his works were some altarpieces for the Cathedral of Ferrara.

References

Bibliography

External links

 Census of Ferrarese Paintings and Drawings

1530s births
1589 deaths
16th-century Italian painters
Italian male painters
Mannerist painters
Painters from Ferrara